Dança dos Famosos 3 was the third season of the Brazilian reality television show Dança dos Famosos which premiered on May 14, 2006 on Rede Globo.

Olympic athlete Robson Caetano & Ivonete Liberato won the competition over Zorra Total cast member Stepan Nercessian & Michelle Cerbino.

Couples

Elimination chart

Key
 
 
  Eliminated
  Bottom two
  Withdrew
  Runner-up
  Winner

Weekly results

Week 1 
Week 1 – Men
Style: Disco
Aired: May 14, 2006

Week 2 
Week 1 – Women
Style: Disco
Aired: May 21, 2006

Week 3 
Week 2 – Men
Style: Merengue
Aired: May 28, 2006

Week 4 
Week 2 – Women
Style: Merengue
Aired: June 4, 2006

Week 5 
Top 8
Style: Bolero
Aired: June 11, 2006

Week 6 
Top 7
Style: Forró
Aired: June 18, 2006

Week 7 
Top 6
Style: Flamenco
Aired: June 25, 2006

Week 8 
Top 5
Style: Rock and Roll
Aired: July 2, 2006

Week 9 
Top 4
Style: Lambada
Aired: July 9, 2006

Week 10 
Top 3
Styles: Pasodoble & Country
Aired: July 16, 2006

Week 11 
Top 2 – Week 1
Styles: Maxixe & Foxtrot
Aired: July 23, 2006

Week 12 
Top 2 – Week 2
Styles: Samba, Tango & Instant dance (Disco – Robson; Rock and Roll – Stepan)
Aired: August 6, 2006

References

External links
 Official Site 

Season 03
2006 Brazilian television seasons

pt:Dança dos Famosos 3